The 1995 Goody's 500 was the 22nd stock car race of the 1995 NASCAR Winston Cup Series and the 35th iteration of the event. The race was held on Saturday, August 26, 1995, in Bristol, Tennessee at Bristol Motor Speedway, a 0.533 miles (0.858 km) permanent oval-shaped racetrack. The race took the scheduled 500 laps to complete. On the final lap of the race, Hendrick Motorsports driver Terry Labonte and Richard Childress Racing driver Dale Earnhardt were battling for the lead. On the final turn of the race, Earnhardt would bump Labonte, sending him into a slide. Labonte would try to get the car straightened up, but would turn the other direction straight into the wall, crossing the finish line while hitting the wall. Earnhardt was not able to pass Labonte while Labonte was wrecking his car. The win therefore went to Labonte; although he had a wrecked car as he crossed the finish line first. The win was Labonte's 17th career NASCAR Winston Cup Series victory and his third and final victory of the season. To fill out the top three, the aforementioned Dale Earnhardt and Robert Yates Racing driver Dale Jarrett would finish second and third, respectively.

Background 

The Bristol Motor Speedway, formerly known as Bristol International Raceway and Bristol Raceway, is a NASCAR short track venue located in Bristol, Tennessee. Constructed in 1960, it held its first NASCAR race on July 30, 1961. Despite its short length, Bristol is among the most popular tracks on the NASCAR schedule because of its distinct features, which include extraordinarily steep banking, an all concrete surface, two pit roads, and stadium-like seating. It has also been named one of the loudest NASCAR tracks.

Entry list 

 (R) denotes rookie driver.

Qualifying 
Qualifying was split into two rounds. The first round was held on Friday, August 25, at 5:30 PM EST. Each driver would have one lap to set a time. During the first round, the top 25 drivers in the round would be guaranteed a starting spot in the race. If a driver was not able to guarantee a spot in the first round, they had the option to scrub their time from the first round and try and run a faster lap time in a second round qualifying run, held on Saturday, August 26, at 1:00 PM EST. As with the first round, each driver would have one lap to set a time. For this specific race, positions 26-34 would be decided on time, and depending on who needed it, a select amount of positions were given to cars who had not otherwise qualified but were high enough in owner's points.

Seven drivers would fail to qualify.

Full qualifying results

Race results

References 

1995 NASCAR Winston Cup Series
NASCAR races at Bristol Motor Speedway
August 1995 sports events in the United States
1995 in sports in Tennessee